The girls' pursuit competition of the biathlon events at the 2012 Winter Youth Olympics in Innsbruck, Austria, was held on January 16, at Seefeld Arena. 47 athletes from 26 nations took part in this event. The race was 7.5 km in length.

Results
The race was started at 12:45.

References

Biathlon at the 2012 Winter Youth Olympics